The 1980 Air Force Falcons football team represented the United States Air Force Academy in the 1981 NCAA Division I-A football season, its first as a member of the Western Athletic Conference (WAC). Led by second-year head coach Ken Hatfield, Air Force played its home games at Falcon Stadium and finished the regular season with a 2–9–1 record, 1–3 in the WAC.

Schedule

Personnel

References

Air Force
Air Force Falcons football seasons
Air Force Falcons football